The Naval Battle of Campeche took place on April 30, 1843, and May 16, 1843. The battle featured the most advanced warships of its day, including the Mexican steamer Guadalupe and the equally formidable Montezuma which engaged a squadron of vessels from the Republic of Yucatan and the Republic of Texas. The latter force consisted of the Texas Navy flagship sloop-of-war Austin, commanded by Commodore Edwin Ward Moore, the brig Wharton, and several schooners and five gunboats from the Republic of Yucatán, commanded by former Texas Navy Captain James D. Boylan. Texas had declared its independence in 1836, but by 1843, Mexico had refused to recognize it. In Yucatán, a similar rebellion had begun and was fought off-and-on from 1836 to 1846. The battle ended in a combined Yucatecan and Texan victory. 
A scene from this battle is engraved on the cylinder of every Colt 1851 Navy, 1860 Army, and 1861 Navy revolver.

Background
Commodore Edwin Ward Moore had been waging a campaign against Mexican interests in the Gulf and disrupting commerce, because it was thought the Mexican army was planning an amphibious assault on Texas in order to recapture the province. Moore could only fully refit and rearm his ships by expending his own funds when he put in at New Orleans. The government of Texas refused him more funds and Sam Houston ordered him back to Texas so the fleet could be sold. The fleet, upon being put up for auction in Galveston, was not sold at that time because the citizens of Galveston rioted, thereby preventing the auction. Moore disregarded Houston's orders, and allied himself with the government of the Republic of Yucatan, which was then under siege from the central Mexican government. Yucatan paid Texas $8,000 a month for the services of the Texas Navy. Moore, now fully funded, sailed to lift the Mexican naval blockade of the port of Campeche.

Battle

The battle began on April 30, and involved the Texas-Yucatan force that had been attacking and clearing the Gulf of Mexico of Mexican merchant and fishing boats, against a small Mexican squadron which consisted of sailing ships and a small steamer, the Regenerator. The initial battle lasted a few hours and was a draw, as both sides retired.

After rearming, the Texan ships, including the 600 ton flagship Austin, on May 16 encountered a much stronger Mexican squadron, which included the modern 878 ton iron-hulled (not "ironclad") paddle frigate Guadalupe and the wooden paddle frigate Montezuma, each armed with two 68-pounder Paixhans guns able to fire exploding shells, commanded by British officers and manned by British and Mexican seamen.

After three hours of broadsides, the battle was essentially a draw, with both sides again withdrawing after sustaining considerable damage and casualties. The Texas ships suffered some physical damage, but the Mexican and British sailors suffered many more casualties of both dead and wounded.

The Mexican steamship Regenerator and its battered attendant squadron rejoined the Guadalupe and the Moctezuma flotilla about May 19, and withdrew from the area, and the Texas squadron retired to Galveston. They were acclaimed as heroes on their return, even though Texas President Sam Houston had declared Commodore Moore and the ships' captains and crew pirates for sailing against his wishes. However, after a court martial, Commodore Moore was acquitted of all piracy charges. Having fought an iron-hulled Mexican steamship and 2 other steamers essentially to a draw using only wooden sailing ships was an achievement for Commodore Moore, the Naval Battle of Campeche becoming the only naval battle in world history in which sailing ships held their own against steam-powered ships in combat.

The battle scene was memorialized by Samuel Colt in an engraving on the cylinder of the famed 1851 and 1861 Colt Navy Revolvers and the Colt 1860 Army Revolver.  This was in expression of gratitude to Commodore Moore who in 1837 had purchased Colt Paterson Revolvers for the Republic of Texas Navy.  By the time of the Battle of Campeche, however, Colt's enterprise was bankrupt.  He would make a comeback in 1847 when under Colonel John C. Hays he was rescued from oblivion and put back to work making guns the Texas Rangers would use in the Mexican War.

Order of battle
Texas Navy:
Austin, 20 guns, 600 ton sloop-of-war, flagship
Wharton, 16 guns, brig

Yucatecan Navy:
Independencia, schooner
Sisaleno, schooner
Five gunboats

Mexican Navy:
Guadalupe, iron hulled paddle frigate, 2 68 pdr. Paixhans guns, 2 32 pdr. 878 tons steamer, flagship
Montezuma, wooden hulled paddle frigate, 2 68 pdr. Paixhans guns, 6 32 pdr., 1,111 ton steamer
Regenerator, steamer
Yucateco, 12 guns, brig
Iman, 7 guns, brig
Aguila, 7 guns, schooner
Campechano, 3 guns, schooner

See also
Naval operations of the Texas Revolution
Battle of the Brazos River
Battle of Matamoros
Battle of Galveston Harbor (1837)

References

Campeche
Campeche
Campeche
1843 in Mexico
1843 in the United States
Republic of Yucatán
History of Campeche
April 1843 events
May 1843 events